Guy Arthur Auguste Rocher  (born April 20, 1924) is a Canadian academic and sociologist.

Born in Berthierville, Quebec, he received a B.A. from the Université de Montréal in 1943, an M.A. in sociology from Université Laval in 1950, and a Ph.D. in sociology from Harvard University in 1958. From 1952 until 1960 he taught at Université Laval. From 1960 he has taught at the Université de Montréal.

Professional career

While a professor at Laval, Rocher in 1957 became one of the founders of the Association internationale des sociologues de langue française, of which organization he was treasurer and a member of its first executive. In 1960, he became a full professor of sociology at Université de Montréal. There he was director of the sociology department (1960–1965), vice-dean of the social sciences faculty (1962–1967) and, from 1979 onwards, he has been a researcher in the Centre de recherche en droit public (Public Law Research Center). Rocher also worked for the government of Quebec, as deputy minister for cultural development (1977–1979) and as deputy minister for social development (1981–1983).

Rocher was a key contributor to Bill 101 in 1977.

Work

Rocher is one of the pioneers in the application of contemporary social sciences to Quebec society, especially including the relationship between Church and State, intergenerational mobility and education, and the sociology of law. He is the author of several books and of numerous articles and scientific reports. He has lectured extensively throughout Canada and abroad.

Honours
 In 1971 he was made a Companion of the Order of Canada.
 In 1991 he was made a Knight of the National Order of Quebec; this was upgraded to Officer in 2018 and to Grand Officer in 2020.
 In 1991 he received the Royal Society of Canada's Pierre Chauveau Medal
 He received the 1997 Molson Prize in the Social Sciences and Humanities.
 In 1999 he received the Royal Society of Canada's Sir John William Dawson Medal.

References

 

1924 births
Living people
Canadian sociologists
Fellows of the Royal Society of Canada
Knights of the National Order of Quebec
Companions of the Order of Canada
Academics in Quebec
People from Lanaudière
French Quebecers
Academic staff of the Université de Montréal
Academic staff of Université Laval
Université Laval alumni
Harvard University alumni
Université de Montréal alumni